The Sunda minivet (Pericrocotus miniatus) is a species of bird in the family Campephagidae.
It is endemic to Indonesia, where it occurs on Sumatra and Java.

Gallery

References

Sunda minivet
Birds of Sumatra
Birds of Java
Sunda minivet
Taxonomy articles created by Polbot